The 1st Lithuanian Fusilier Reserve Battalion (or ) was a fusilier battalion of the Royal Prussian Army formed by Lithuanians.

1813

Formation 
Ludwig Yorck von Wartenburg marched into Königsberg on 8 January 1813 and immediately declared the mobilisation of all remaining able-bodied men. First, he called all the Krümper and recruits, which von Bülow had left to the east of the Vistula. So, Yorck created a large training camp to train the new soldiers. On March 1, seven reserve battalions were formed, which were the:

 1st East Prussian Musketeer Reserve Battalion
 2nd East Prussian Musketeer Reserve Battalion
 3rd East Prussian Musketeer Reserve Battalion
 4th East Prussian Musketeer Reserve Battalion
 1st Lithuanian Fusilier Reserve Battalion
 2nd Lithuanian Fusilier Reserve Battalion
 3rd Lithuanian Fusilier Reserve Battalion
The 1st Lithuanian Fusilier Reserve Battalion was formed in Königsberg, under the command of Major . Major von Lettow was from the 2nd West Prussian Infantry Regiment. The battalion was supposed to have 60 Non-commissioned officers, 13 musicians, 4 surgeons, and 728 Gemeiner.

At the end of May, this battalion was in Cottbus. Under the same commander, the unit fought in the Battle of Luckau on June 4.

Assigning to various regiments 
The unit retained its name until July 1. Then, on 1 July 1813, this and other reserve battalions were concentrated into various reserve regiments. The 1st Lithuanian Fusilier Reserve Battalion was made the 1st Reserve Infantry Regiment's 3rd, i.e. Fusilier, Battalion. At the time, the unit was commanded by Major von Röming.

1815 
After Napoleon was defeated, the Prussian Army was reorganized, and so the 1st Reserve Infantry Regiment became the 13th Infantry Regiment on 1 March 1815.

Footnotes

Sources 

Military units and formations established in 1813
Lithuanian units of the Royal Prussian Army